Cuyonon is a regional Bisayan language spoken on the coast of Palawan and the Cuyo Islands in the Philippines. Cuyonon had been the lingua franca (language used for communication) of the province of Palawan until recently when migration flow into the region rapidly increased. 43% of the total population of Palawan during the late 1980s spoke and used Cuyonon as a language. Later studies showed a significant decrease in the number of speakers due to an increase of Tagalog-speaking immigrants from Luzon. 

The Cuyonon language is classified by the Summer Institute of Linguistics as belonging to the Central Philippine, Western Bisayan, Kuyan subgroup. The largest number of speakers lives in the Cuyo Group of Islands, which is located between Northern Palawan and Panay Island.

Phonology

Consonants

Vowels 

Unlike most Philippine languages, it only consists of one close vowel. The close vowel  only occurs in loanwords from Spanish, either directly or through Tagalog.

Simple greetings
Good afternoon – 
Good evening/night – 
How are you? – 
I'm fine/good and you? – 
I'm just fine, by the grace of God – 
Thank you – 
Where are you going? – 
What are you doing? – 
Oh, nothing in particular. – 
Please come in. – 
Long time no see. –

Common expressions

Parts of the body

References

External links
Cuyonon Language and Culture Project, cuyonon.org
Linguistic map of the Philippines
Linguistic map of the Philippines
Linguistic map of the Philippines

Languages of Palawan
Visayan languages